Ficus luschnathiana is a species of plant in the family Moraceae. It is found in Argentina, Brazil, Bolivia, Paraguay, and Uruguay.

References

luschnathiana
Least concern plants
Taxonomy articles created by Polbot